Paddington is an inner suburb in the City of Brisbane, Queensland, Australia.

As is common with other suburbs in the area, Paddington is located on a number of steep ridges and hills. It was settled in the 1860s. Many original and distinctive Queenslander homes can be found in the suburb. Houses are frequently built on stumps, owing to the steep nature of their blocks. Between 2005 and 2010, the median house price has risen over 50% to $1,125,000.

Paddington includes the neighbourhood of Rosalie, which has its centre at the junction of Baroona Road and Nash Street  and was a separate suburb until 1975.

Geography
Paddington lies in a valley in the foothills of Mount Coot-tha The area is extremely hilly with many peaks and gullies. Most of the retail is located along the ridgetops which contain the main roads of Given Terrace and Latrobe Terrace. Given Terrace commences near Suncorp Stadium and rises to the west (colloquially referred to as "lower Paddington"). At the junction of Latrobe Terrace and Given Terrace, Given Terrace turns south-west downhill towards Rosalie on the left while on the right there is a steep drop to a gully which then rises again to the Red Hill ridge. The Latrobe Terrace is colloquially known as "upper Paddington" with the road sticking to the ridgetop with gentle slopes on either side until moving uphill towards the suburb of Bardon.

The suburb is predominantly residential, on small blocks of land by Queensland standards, with many workers cottages and Queenslander-style homes with corrugated iron roofs. Paddington includes the small locality of Rosalie. The suburb of Petrie Terrace lies to the east.

Ithaca Creek, which now largely exists in the suburb of Red Hill, runs down from the Taylor Mountain Range and Paddington originally developed around a series of water holes that ran from the Creek to the Brisbane River.

History

The wooded slopes and ridges were home to the Turrbal, known by British settlers as the Duke of York's clan. In the early days Aborigines camped in Armstrong's Paddock on what is now Armstrong Terrace and also on the former Paddington Tram Depot on Enoggera Terrace.

British settlement 
British settlement in Paddington commenced in the 1850s and the area was known as "Ti-Tree Flats" as the first residents moved there to cultivate gardens on the flats and to cut timber. The first sale of land occurred in 1859 with the sale of fifty-five lots. The name Paddington comes from the name of the farm of Mr B, Clay who named his farm after his London birthplace of Paddington. The Paddington farm was sold and subdivided in 1864.

Petrie Terrace State School opened in March 1868 with separate sections for boys and girls. In 1875 the school was split into Petrie Terrace Boys State School and Petrie Terrace Girls and Infants State School. In 1953 there was another re-arrangement resulting in Petrie Terrace Infants State School for the younger children and Petrie Terrace State School for the older children. In 1960 Petrie Terrace Infants State School closed and the Infants were transferred to Petrie Terrace State School.

A Primitive Methodist Church opened at 244 Given Terrace circa June 1877. In 1906, a  new church building was erected on the site at 238 Given Terrace with the old church building moved to one side to become the church hall. The 1906 church was burned down in 1996. Some brick fencing from the church remains on the site, now occupied by modern commercial buildings.

Development was slow as the steep slopes created challenges for the emerging public transport and even architecture. In 1879 a horse bus was introduced and by the 1880s hill-top mansions and workers cottages in the gullies had been built.

Paddington was in the local government area of Ithaca Division from 1879 to 1887, then Shire of Ithaca from 1887 to 1903, and then Town of Ithaca from 1903 to 1925, after which Ithaca was amalgamated into the present City of Brisbane.

The Morris family owned and operated the boot and footwear factory on the corner of Hale and Caxton Streets from the 1880s until it was sold in the 1960s. The second factory building was built in 1930 and the F.T Morris Footwear company employed up to 180 workers and could make 630 pairs of boots and shoes a day. The company was sold in the 1960s to Dixon & Sons and while the business continued to make a profit for a while bit eventually could not compete with cheaper imports and nylon and canvas mass-produced shoes. The factory closed in 1973. The second factory building in Caxton Street was reopened in 1976 as the "Spaghetti Emporium" restaurant, complete with a giant boot on the roof. In the 1980s, the building became the nightclub "Brisbane Underground" but it was demolished for the controversial Hale Street city by-pass in 1990.

At one stage gold was found near the old Paddington Cemetery and shafts were sunk.

The Brisbane Tramways Company, a private enterprise formed in 1895, introduced the first electric trams to Brisbane in mid-1897. Following lobbying by the Ithaca Shire Council, a tramway was extended along Musgrave Road to Red Hill, and a line was laid along Caxton Street and Given Terrace as far as Latrobe Terrace in 1898. By 1906-7 electric trams ran along Caxton Street and the Paddington line was extended until it reached Bardon in 1937. The Red Hill line was extended to Ashgrove in 1924. The tramways substation was erected in 1929–30 at the corner of Latrobe and Enoggera Terraces.

In 1898 the Roman Catholic Archbishop Robert Dunne purchased land on the corner of Given Terrace and Fernberg Road, Rosalie, to build a Catholic church called Sacred Heart at a cost of £500. It was part of the parish of Red Hill and Father Hegarty, parish priest of Red Hill, celebrated the first Mass.

The 1900s 
The spread of the tramways network was a catalyst for residential development in the western suburbs. It was during the first decade of the 20th century that Ithaca experienced a housing and population boom which was largely attributable to the expansion of the tramways through the area.

Sacred Heart Parish School was opened in 1906 in a building beside the church and was operated by the Sisters of Mercy. It closed on 12 November 1995 due to the changing demographics of the area reducing the number of children wanting Catholic education.

In the 1910s the Ithaca Town Council embarked on a programme of civic improvements which included the establishment of Lang Park (1917), the Ithaca Swimming Pool (1917), and the Ithaca Children's Playground (1918) and associated formation of roads, tree planting, construction of embankment gardens, small reserves and street gardens throughout the suburbs of Red Hill, Kelvin Grove, Paddington, Rosalie, Bardon, and parts of Milton. Because of the hilly terrain, many of the new streets were divided, leaving embankments which the Ithaca Town Council considered were cheaper to plant and beautify than to cut down. This approach placed the Council at the forefront of street beautification projects in the Brisbane metropolitan area and Australia and led to numerous requests for advice in civic landscaping from other councils, interstate as well as within Queensland. At the second Australian Town Planning Conference and Exhibition, held in Brisbane in July–August 1918, the Ithaca Town Council exhibited photographs showing treatment of ugly cuttings and street improvements which beautify the street and at the same time solve practical difficulties. The Ithaca Embankments on mid Latrobe Terrace are a good example of the same.

On 25 February 1922, Sir Matthew Nathan, the Governor of Queensland unveiled the Ithaca War Memorial to commemorate local people who had died in World War I.

Prior to 1925 the suburb was administered by the Ithaca Town Council. In that year the council was amalgamated with 24 other councils to form the Brisbane City Council.

In 1927 the water tower at Garfield Terrace was opened. At the opening the President said it had always been the aim of the Water Board to afford facilities to provide a full water supply to all residents on elevated land. For a time the area was referred to as Paddington Heights, supposedly to differentiate it from the more traditional working class Paddington.

Archbishop James Duhig wanted to establish a monastery and school in Rosalie for the Marist Brothers. On 29 July 1928 the foundation stone was laid by B. Catteneo at a site  opposite the church on Fernberg Road. Building work was completed in time for Marist Brothers College Rosalie to open on 28 January 1929 with an initial enrolment of 135 boys. The school was officially opened on 20 February 1929 by Archbishop Duhig. The monastery was also used as a boarding school until 1940. On Sunday 6 June 1948  the foundation stone for the new Brothers school building was laid by Duhg accompanied by  Éamon de Valera, who was travelling around Australia to speak and associate with the many Irish immigrants who had made Australia their home, at the end of his term of office of Taoiseach (Prime Minister) of Ireland. De Valera's visit was controversial given his role in the Irish War of Independence against the British Government and there was reluctance to hold civic receptions in his honour. Nonetheless, a crowd of nearly 2.000 people attended the laying of the foundation stone including the Labor Premier of Queensland (and staunch Catholic and local resident) Ned Hanlon and the Works Minister, Bill Power.  At the ceremony at Rosalie, de Valera said "...the new school was part of the evidence of the magnificent works of charity and community effort that he had seen in every capital of the Commonwealth." On 2 October 1949 Duhig formally opened the new school building which had cost £35,000. The school closed in 2008 despite considerable protests from families currently and formerly associated with the school. The school buildings are now used as the Lavalla Centre, a conference and meeting facility.

In the early 1960s Lord Mayor Clem Jones of the Labor Party embarked on an ambitious programme to "sewer" Brisbane and within five years all the residences were sewered. Occasionally "outhouses" can still be seen in back yards. Following on from that over the next 10 years or so bitumen was laid to the sides of all roads. Bitumen used to extend to curbs only on the main roads. The 1960s saw the first steps of inner Brisbane moving away from a "country" town to an urban city.

Until December 1968 electric trams, operated first by the Brisbane Tramways Company and later the Brisbane City Council, operated along all four main thoroughfares in the suburb. A tram depot (garage) was located on Latrobe Terrace between 1915 and 1962, when it was destroyed in one of Brisbane's largest fires. The cause of the Paddington tram depot fire is not known however arson and public corruption has been rumoured for years. Sixty-five of Brisbane's trams were destroyed which was a large proportion of its fleet. After the fire Old Dreadnought trams were pressed into service, and eight replacement (Phoenix) trams were built, but Lord Mayor Clem Jones began to close lines almost immediately. The destruction of the depot is generally seen as the beginning of the end for Brisbane's tram system, providing the justification for the subsequent closure of four tram routes, the gradual encroachment of bus operation on other tram routes with the final closure of the tram system occurring on 13 April 1969.

The 1970s reflected the new ethnic mix in Paddington and though still a working class area many Italian restaurants opened in the area as did various "fish and chip" shops, delicatessens, and tailors. Though hardly cosmopolitan by Melbourne and Sydney standards, Paddington along with New Farm and West End, was at the forefront of exposing traditional Brisbane residents to cuisines and cultures from around the world.

The 1974 Brisbane flood which ravaged much of Brisbane largely left Paddington proper alone. The main roads and shops of Paddington were on the ridge tops and it was only the houses in the gullies and dips that were affected. The same cannot be said of the Rosalie area or that part of Paddington near Milton where flood waters affected most properties, at some points reaching roof lines.

In 1975 the suburb of Rosalie was merged into Paddington with Rosalie being accorded neighbourhood status within Rosalie.

Paddington was one of the first suburbs in Brisbane to undergo "gentrification" in the mid-1980s. Accommodation prices rose sharply as younger white collar workers moved closer to the CBD as factories, and factory workers, were relocated to the outer suburbs. As a result, there was much development in the area. The old Paddington Hotel in Given Terrace was demolished and an American style "tavern" was built in its place, whilst across the road the Paddington movie theatre was demolished in 1981 and a shopping arcade, "The Paddington Centre", was built on its site. On Latrobe Terrace the basic brick functional "Paddington Central" shopping centre (formerly the Paddington Tram Depot) was demolished and a more modern shopping centre was built.

The Hale Street Inner City Bypass North-West Ring Road effectively split Petrie Terrace from Paddington and Red Hill and upset the local community greatly. What was a suburban street became a 4 lane main road. In the process a number of houses were resumed by the State government who already had been criticized for a lack of community consultation. To make matters worse the residents of the area were elderly or workers and otherwise people without a political voice. Some of those whose houses were to be resumed refused to be evicted and were forcibly ejected by the Queensland Police. The only local benefit was that when the development occurred, land, previously unallocated state land, was given to the adjoining playground.

The 2000s 
At the turn of century again there was a substantial local opposition to the Queensland Governments proposed redevelopment of Lang Park. The park was widely perceived to be adequate for the Rugby League games it held however the Labor Party State government and the Lang Park Trustees had other ideas of turning it into a modern large scale money making venue. The State government sold the idea, rather disingenuously, as an upgrade to the "home of the working mans game Rugby League in Queensland". Local opposition to the redevelopment was concerned with the lack of car parking at the venue, remote access to public transport as well as difficulties the suburb would have in dealing with the increased numbers of crowds. Vocal opponents frequently referred to the Brisbane Exhibition Grounds in the nearby Bowen Hills as being more suitable, with all the transport infrastructure already there and the already proven ability to deal with large crowds every Exhibition week. The issue threatened to be an election issue and though Labor was returned in the area and locally it is significant to note that Labor locally lost a substantial number of votes which were picked up by the local Greens party candidate who ran on a "no stadium" platform. With little public consultation the project went ahead and was renamed "Suncorp Stadium" after the chief money sponsor. Ultimately though the venue is an "eyesore" the surrounds are better maintained and neater than that of the previous Lang Park. Ironically, though crowd movement on event days is still a problem, the rugby league crowds are not greatly larger than before leading to the need for other sports to be played there including soccer and rugby union.

The median age of the Paddington population was 32 years of age, 5 years below the Australian median. 73.6% of people living in Paddington were born in Australia, compared to the national average of 69.8%; the next most common countries of birth were England 4.5%, New Zealand 3.5%, Ireland 1.1%, United States of America 1%, South Africa 0.9%. 86% of people spoke only English at home; the next most common languages were 1.3% Italian, 0.8% German, 0.8% French, 0.8% Spanish, 0.5% Mandarin.

Culture 
Prior to the late 1980s many factories circled the Brisbane CBD which had very little residential accommodation. Accordingly, the suburbs of Paddington, Red Hill, Milton, New Farm, Spring Hill, Fortitude Valley were considered "inner city" suburbs and housed many workers families as well as seasonal workers who worked in those factories. The relatively cheap housing also meant that new migrants, itinerants, students, artists, and disenfranchised Aboriginals lived in the area.

Accordingly, Paddington was traditionally working class mainly made of Australians, old Irish Catholic Australians, indigenous aboriginal people and new waves of Catholics migrants. The first Catholic migrants were the Irish and then the Italians, Croatians, Polish and Hungarians came in the 1950s, 1960s and 1970s.

The high proportion of Catholics in the area during those years is attested to by the fact that there are seven Catholic churches, one boys Catholic High school (threatened with closure), two girls Catholic high schools, four primary Catholic schools (one defunct), and various Catholic halls and refectories all within a three-mile radius.

Similarly the Catholic migrants had their clubs nearby with the Polish club in the neighbouring suburb of Milton, the Italian club a suburb away in Newmarket and the Croatian club formerly in Roma Street in the Brisbane CBD and then Fortitude Valley before securing premises at Morningside and then building a club and soccer fields at Rocklea.

Today the sons and daughters of immigrant families are a continuing presence in the Paddington area as many of the commercial and residential premises are owned by the "new" migrant families that settled in the area.

The low cost of the area also meant that young people and students moved to the area and brought their own "do it yourself" entertainment with them. By 1976 various members of the punk band "The Saints" lived in a share house in Petrie Terrace and even created a club there, "Club 76". It was Bailey's sister who rented the terrace house on the corner of Petrie Terrace and Milton Road, near the Windmill Café in Petrie Terrace. Bailey moved into the basement and, when his sister moved out, Hay and Wegener ( of "The Saints") moved in. The band would frequently play parties there when no other venues were available, until the storefront was smashed in by an unhappy neighbour. Undaunted, the band nailed boards up and splashed "Club 76″ across the front of the place. Though in reality the club was a room in the house where they lived and was constantly harassed by police, and closed down by the Health department when it was found to have only one toilet. In January 1977 the Saints celebrated the release of the album and the cover picture (and subsequent video clip) was taken down the road from Club '76 in an abandoned terrace house.

With the influx of young people into the area there was a resurgence of popularity in the area as an entertainment precinct. The Paddington Tavern became a well known drinking spot for younger people. The Paddington Workers Club has at various times been used as a live band venue as has the Caxton Street Hall while the Paddington Centre upstairs housed the famous night clubs, Café Neon and Viva and the old boot factory on Caxton Street housed the "Spaghetti Emporium" restaurant and then the "Underground" night club before being demolished.

The Caxton Street Hall (which since has been the Velvet Cigar strip club and is now Lefty's Old Time Music Hall) was also a notorious live venue which hosted gigs by "The Saints", "The Go-Betweens", "The X-Men", "Died Pretty", "Xero", The Black Assassins, les Bon Bons, Razar and others as did the Lang Park Leagues Club. The general mood of the time was captured by The Saints in their song "Brisbane (Security City)"(1978).

Police had been wary and aggressive towards the local Brisbane punks for some time and had employed their "baton" first ask questions later attitude on many occasions. The Queensland Police Service was a tight knit unit under the right wing Conservative State government who had been in power since 1957 and were largely seen to be the front line troops enforcing the government's conservative views on religion, social policy and public behaviour.

The Caxton Street Hall was a natural target for plainclothes police and undercover operatives. The hall (then known as the Baroona Hall) had since its inception in the 1890s been a community centre with a largely working class association including being used by the suffrage movement, the anti World War I movement, as a meeting place for strike organisation, an Australian Labor Party meeting place and a co-operative community welfare centre. By the 1970s it was serving as a venue of the burgeoning civil liberties movement and in 1976 the Baroona Legal Service (the Caxton Street legal Service after 1980) was established, much to the chagrin of the police, to provide free legal advice for people who could not afford it otherwise. It was there that the young people and elderly sought advice. At night the hall became a venue for local punks and local independent radio station 4ZZZ to put on concerts. Local Brisbane punks however because of the stifling and oppressive political climate were more politicized than punks in other States.

The most notorious gig at the Caxton was on 30 November 1979 following a gig by local punk band "The Sharks". As the crowd came out onto the footpath, police waded in and began arresting patrons. 12 teenagers were arrested and assaulted on the footpath and back and at the police watch house.

In the 2000s, prices for housing continue to rise in the area; however many of the traditional residents of the area still reside there giving the area a colourful mix of young urbanites and older retired working people.

Transport
By road: the main thoroughfares of Paddington are Given, Latrobe and Enoggera Terraces. Most shops are located on Given and Latrobe Terraces.

By bus: Buses operated by Brisbane Transport continue to serve the suburb. And in conditions free of traffic congestion a bus trip from the Brisbane CBD takes around ten minutes to upper Paddington.

Attractions

Nightlife and entertainment

Largely due to Paddington's proximity to the Brisbane CBD, tertiary institutions as the University of Queensland (in St Lucia), Kelvin Grove campus of the Queensland University of Technology (in Kelvin Grove), the Queensland University of Technology itself (in the Brisbane CBD), the Red Hill TAFE (in Red Hill), as well as housing suitable for "share-housing" (older wooden houses with multiple small rooms) and the general culture of the area (former working class and multicultural) many young people, especially students, live in the area.

As a result, there are a number of night clubs on Given Terrace including the Paddington Tavern, and many smaller bars that change owners on a regular basis. The Paddington Tavern also plays hosts to the "Sit Down Comedy Club" which over the years has hosted Arj Barker, Carl Barron, Dave Hughes, Eric Bana, Jimeoin, Judith Lucy, Kitty Flanagan, Lano and Woodley, Mick Molloy, Rodney Rude, Ross Noble, Shane Bourne, Steady Eddy, Tripod, The Umbilical Brothers and Wil Anderson amongst many others.

Paddington was one of the first, if not the first, suburbs to be gentrified, and developed a coffee culture in the 1980s which is still significant and vibrant today. Similarly, being an area with a large migrant population in the 1960s and 1970s, there are many restaurants in the area. Most of these coffee houses, small bars, eateries and restaurants are located along the  Given Terrace and Latrobe Terrace  that run through Paddington.

Similarly, there are many art galleries in the area and many artists as well as musicians and budding writers live in the area.

Traditional institutions like the Union Cooperative Society Ltd incorporating the Paddington Workers Club and the Brisbane Workers Community Centre exist. It is a member-owned organisation that aims to improve the social and economic well-being of its members and their community and was formed in 1965 to protect the incomes of workers from rising prices by providing goods and services at the lowest possible cost. While the Cooperative has largely moved out of retail there is still a small bar which doubles as a live venue but otherwise it is now a financial organisation that cares for members' financial interests.

Senior citizens are catered for by the Brisbane West Senior Citizens Club at 132 Latrobe Terrace which host activities and respite services for senior citizens.

The Centre for Multicultural Pastoral Care at 333 Given Terrace which was originally established in 1949 and provides pastoral care for post World War II immigrants from traditionally Catholic countries.

The nearby Brisbane Arts Theatre at 210 Petrie Terrace is a theatre company that has been producing plays for over 60 years.

The smaller localities of Rosalie and Torwood also has a thriving restaurant, café, and gourmet culture along Baroona Road which also hosts an annual Cheese Festival and where art house cinema can be viewed at the Blue Room Cinebar.

Shopping

Many houses along Given Terrace and Latrobe Terrace were converted into small shops in the 1980s and accordingly Paddington has a vibrant shopping scene for speciality shops of all types including fashion (clothes, shoes, male and female), food (chocolate, cheese, alcohol and organic), home wares ( bathroom supplies and hardware) and entertainment ( new and secondhand book stores, picture framing, video stores) and is largely devoid of the larger "chain" shops.

A thriving antique, second hand and opportunity shop scene exists in the area with the Paddington Antique Centre being the centrepiece. The Paddington Antique Centre is in the former Paddington Plaza Theatre located on Latrobe Terrace. The building has at various times been a movie theatre, dance hall and storage facility. It accommodates over 50 antique dealers trading under the one banner. The centre attracts many collectors both interstate and overseas.

The Union Cooperative Society building on the corner of Given and Latrobe Terraces was originally home to a grocery and petrol co-operative that provided lower cost household goods, groceries and petrol to its members. The building still houses the Workers' social club and is a hub of locally owned small businesses such as Chercher La Femme, Biome Eco Stores and Cocoon Petit Living and Simpatico restaurant.
 
Paddington Central on Latrobe Terrace, situated on the site of a former shopping complex which was originally the site of the Paddington Tram Station is the largest shopping complex in Paddington and contains a supermarket, a number of cafes, Il Posto Italian Restaurant as well as Paddington Medical Centre and Travel Clinic, a local family owned pharmacy Paddington Central Pharmacy and other speciality shops.

Outdoor
There a number of small parks in the area including the Neal Macrossan Park on Caroline Street (also known as Ithaca Playground) which also incorporates Paddington Skate Park and Tennis Courts and the adjacent Ithaca public pool on lower Caxton Street. The site has aesthetic significance as a public open space with extremely large Moreton Bay fig trees which line lower Caxton Street and Moreton Street and are significant landmark elements. The playground comprises three buildings along the northern boundary, adjacent to the kindergarten; a tennis court in the north eastern along Caroline Street; a skate bowl, known as Father Perry Place on the eastern side of the swimming pool; a large oval on the western side of the swimming pool and terraced playground space in the central area. The three buildings at the Neal Macrossan Playground are a large public hall facing Moreton Street, a small former free library to the east of this, and abutting this on the eastern side is a covered play area. A locomotive was added to the playground on 20 March 1973 but this was removed in 1995.

A larger multiuse park, Gregory Park, is located on Baroona Road near the Rosalie café precinct.

There is a fallen soldiers Memorial Park on the corner of Latrobe Terrace and Enoggera Terrace and a small park named after the former tram workers of the area, "Trammies Corner" on the corner of Latrobe Terrace and Prince Street.

The Suncorp Stadium (formerly known as Lang Park) is located on Castlemaine Street in Milton but fronts lower Caxton Street and hosts a number of sporting events. The Old Stadium, Lang Park, was the official home of Brisbane Rugby League, the defunct South Queensland Crushers, and then finally when Brisbane sponsored a national Rugby League club it became the home the "Brisbane Broncos". The old stadium was torn down in 2001 and te new stadium was built which hosts Brisbane Broncos Rugby league games, Rugby Union international test games, Brisbane Roar soccer games, as well as a number of other sporting and music one-offs.

Worship

There are a number of churches in Paddington proper including two Catholic and one Presbyterian Church. The Catholic parish of Jubilee has its parish headquarters on Given Terrace. The churches are located at:

Sacred Heart Catholic Church, 355 Given Terrace, Paddington.
St Thomas More Catholic Church, 111 Hale Street, Petrie Terrace, with mass in Italian.
Enoggera Presbyterian Church Building, 100 Enoggera Terrace, Paddington.

There are a further three Catholic churches in adjoining suburbs, a number of small Catholic Chapels, an Anglican church (in Milton, based at St Francis College on the historic Bishopbourne site), a Baptist church, and a Uniting Church. The nearest cemetery is the nearby Brisbane General Cemetery at Toowong (locally known as Toowong Cemetery) which is the largest cemetery in Brisbane though it is largely closed.

Nearby
Paddington adjoins the suburbs of:

Auchenflower, which is home to The Wesley Hospital a private hospital located near the Auchenflower train station and Auchenflower Stadium (also known as NAB Stadium), previously known as The Auchendome, a basketball centre.
Petrie Terrace, which is home to the upper Caxton street hotels, restaurants and shops
Red Hill, which is the home of the Broncos football club, Ithaca campus of Brisbane North Institute of TAFE, the Ithaca Bowls club and a State primary School;
Milton, which has Suncorp Stadium (also known as Lang Park), the Park Road café and restaurant precinct, and the Milton railway station;
Bardon which backs onto the Mt Cootha native reserve and has the Wests Rugby League Club, Bardon Junior Soccer Club, the Bardon Bowls Club, Brisbane Irish Rugby Football Club, and the West Brisbane Cricket Club. Local schools include one Catholic Primary School, two State Primary Schools and a Catholic Girls High School
Ashgrove (at the "sub-suburb" Jubilee end of Ashgrove) which has shopping complexes, parks and Catholic boys' and girls' high schools.

Education
Petrie Terrace State School is a government primary (Prep-6) school for boys and girls at 40 Moreton Street.  It is nestled below St Brigid's Church, Red Hill and behind the fig trees near the Ithaca Swimming Pool. In 2017, the school had an enrolment of 234 students with 20 teachers (15 full-time equivalent) and 18 non-teaching staff (9 full-time equivalent). It includes a special education program.

Schools in nearby suburbs also supply primary education to children in Paddington, including Ithaca Creek State School to the north in Bardon, Rainworth State School also in Bardon to the west, and Milton State School in Milton to the south.

There are no secondary schools in Paddington. The nearest secondary school is Kelvin Grove State College in Kelvin Grove.

There is a C&K childcare on Charlotte Street. There are also several nearby kindergartens including three Lady Gowrie Centres in Spring Hill. There is a Lady Gowrie day care centre and kindergarten on Enoggera Terrace, Red Hill, Kindy Patch Paddington, also on Enoggera Terrace behind a church, Chatterbox Long Day Care, which offers a Qld Govt approved Kindergarten program and is located on Guthrie Street and another in Elizabeth St, Rosalie. Avenues Child Care and Kindergarten and others are cropping up in the local area as well as a result of a focus by the federal government on early years education. From 2013 to Dec, 2019, the Federal Government has subsidised primary teachers wishing to/willing to transition to Early Years Education and Care.

Architecture 

Brisbane has a lower inner city population density than Australia's two largest cities, Sydney and Melbourne. The lower population density reflects the fact that most of Brisbane's housing stock formerly consisted of detached houses. Early legislation decreed a minimum size for residential blocks resulting in few terrace houses being constructed. The high density housing that did exist came in the form of miniature Queenslander-style houses which resemble the much larger traditional styles but are sometimes only 1/4 the size. Commonly they were called "workers cottages". Many of the residences in the area are still the original and distinctive workers cottages, which are frequently built on stumps owing to the steep nature of their blocks. Most of the blocks are 16 perch (405 square metres) in size though 24 perch (607 square metres) and 32 perch (809 square metres) are common though typical to all blocks the houses tend to be at the front of the block close to the street. There has been a tendency, mainly by real estate agents for selling purposes to label these houses "Queenslanders" and though they do exist in the area the vast majority of houses are the small wooded 2 or 3 bedroom "workers cottages" with front verandas. These houses are all wood as the material was cheap in south east Queensland. The houses usually had "hopper" windows, high ceilings, vertical internal "VJ" wall boards and wooden floors covered in linoleum floor covering. They were usually on wooden stumps with wooden vertical palings between the stumps. The height of the stumps, and how high off the ground the house was depended not so much on utilising the underneath of the house area but rather on the angle of the block or how likely the area was to flood. The houses were also raised to allow air to circulate freely underneath thereby reducing the internal temperature of the house in the summer months. Roofs were traditionally of corrugated iron.

There was a tendency to enclose the verandas in the 1940s and 1950s and create "sun rooms" or "sleep outs" so the family could have more internal living space. These modifications were usually made with fibro which was popular and affordable at the time (though if there was enough money wood was used) with windows in the vertical louver style.

The other noticeable influence on the local architecture came with the influx of southern European migrants, mainly Italians and Croatians in the 1950s and 1960s. These migrants brought trade skills with them from Europe, mainly brick laying, plastering or steel work. It became the norm for migrants to "convert' and update the workers cottages for their needs. Hopper windows were replaced with casement windows, internal "VJ" wall boards were covered with masonite, wood parquetry replaced the linoleum, wooden stumps were replaced with concrete stumps, the underneath of the house was enclosed with besser blocks, air blocks, or brick work whilst allowing a garage for a car, common areas underneath and around the house were concreted, and wooden hand rails were replaced with steel handrails in a number of designs popular in the early 1960s. There has been a tendency to "revert" these renovations to the more traditional cottage design though many examples of this unofficial architectural style still exist and have a charm in themselves which refers to a distinct era of development.

Subsequent to the mini housing boom of the 1980s, there was a flurry of activity in the area with many of the larger 32 perch blocks of land being sub-divided into two 16 perch blocks and residences in the workers cottage style being made on the new land.

Recent housing renovations trends have been to "lift" and build in underneath or more commonly extend off the back into the back yard to give more living space popular with families today. The increased "internal" living space means that the "big back yard" concept has virtually disappeared.

Multi residence accommodations (such as apartment blocks) are relative newcomers to Brisbane, with few such blocks built before 1970. Perhaps because of the trade skills of the new migrants though there were a number of "6 pack" brick apartment blocks made in the 70s and 80s.

Heritage listings 
Paddington has a number of heritage-listed sites, including:

 14 Caroline Street: Neal Macrossan Playground
 50 Elizabeth Street: Rosalie RSL Hall
 57 Elizabeth Street: Rosalie Community Kindergarten and Preschool
 Enoggera Terrace: Ithaca War Memorial
 140 Enoggera Terrace: former Ithaca Fire Station
 150 Enoggera Terrace: Paddington Tramways Substation
 Fernberg Road: Marist Brothers College Rosalie Buildings
 23 Fernberg Road: Lucerne
 170 Fernberg Road: Government House
 16 Garfield Drive: Paddington Water Tower
 34 Howard Street: Glenworth
 50 Howard Street: Boondah
 90 Howard Street: Baroona
 16 Latrobe Terrace: Foresters' Hall
 163-169 Latrobe Terrace: Paddington Antiques Centre

Notable buildings 
The majority of notable non-residential buildings exist in the area, notably along Caxton Street, Given Terrace, Latrobe Terrace and Enoggera Terrace.

Given Terrace

 The Paddington Tavern at 186 Given Terrace, which is a modern tavern built on the site of the old Paddington Hotel which was demolished in the early 1980s
 The Hanlon shops at 216-228 Given Terrace, which are "terraced" styled shops with accommodation above formerly owned by the family of Pat Hanlon, who was the brother to Premier Ned Hanlon. The building was originally constructed in the 1880s and has been modified since however the original structure is still visible.
 The old Uniting Church at 234-244 Given Terrace was sold to private interests in the 1980s and burnt down in 1996 after development proposals were rejected by the Brisbane City Council (a fate that was to befall the Red Hill Roller Skating rink). The wooden building was built in 1906 to accommodate the new congregation of the merged local Wesleyan and Primitive Methodist churches. The building was designed specifically for the triangular block and the new commercial and residential building largely reflects the shape of the original building. The only remaining feature of the Church are the brick retaining walls facing Given Terrace.
 The old Sheard's Bakery at 265 – 267 Given Terrace. Constructed around 1888 it was a bakery for many years before being sold and converted into a shop and then restaurant.
 The Kookaburra Café at 280 Given Terrace. Built around 1888 the building stands on land once owned by a person using the name Louis Le Gould who claimed he was the son of a French General who was Aide-de-camp to Napoleon Bonaparte. Le Gould was a licensed surveyor who was an unsuccessful candidate for alderman in November 1863, a local newspaper calling him pseudo-Gallic, lacking honor and reputable conduct.
 The former Paddington Post Office on 293 Given Terrace at the corner of Latrobe Terrace, is a classic example of a Type T15 Federation Timber design, built in 1900. These commercial buildings feature a gable in the facade, including vent; veranda / porch with near flat roof, columns span the front with a balustrade around the porch and a large lantern vent centrally place in the roof.
 The Sisters of Mercy Sacred Heart Convent at 327 Given Terrace, Paddington built in 1917. The building is representative of the Federation Queen Anne style in the timber detailing and asymmetrical façade. It is a good typical of the design of convents throughout Australia, which were built as prominent and substantial buildings, and were designed with the chapel within, often expressed as a projecting bay. The convent was designed by the architect T. R. Hall who designed other buildings for the Catholic Church including Our Lady of Victories, Bowen Hills, in partnership with GG Prentice. Hall designed other prominent buildings during this partnership, including the city hall, McDonnell and East building and the travel centre of New South Wales. The building is in private ownership though is heritage listed.
 The Sacred Heart Church, Rosalie, at 358 Given Terrace, is a large Catholic church which was opened on 16 June 1918 and designed by prominent architect G. M. Addison. The church has a single-manual mechanical action organ was originally installed by J. W. Walker & Sons of London in 1885 and it is fully enclosed. It suffered damage by fire in 1942. In 1982 restoration was undertaken by H. W. Jarrott of Brisbane. The building is heritage listed
 The old Ashton butchers building at 7-9 Latrobe Terrace (now a private business). Originally built in 1888 it housed Ashton's Butchers until the 1910s when it was taken over by the government and became the State Butchery.
 Foresters' Hall, at 16 Latrobe Terrace (now a St Vincent de Paul "Vinnies" opportunity Shop). This timber hall was built between June and September in 1888 for the Trustees of Court Foresters' Hope, number 6535 of the Ancient Order of Foresters' Friendly Society, United Brisbane District and demonstrates a way of life during the late nineteenth and early twentieth centuries when friendly societies, which provided a welfare service by means of mutual aid, were a prominent and expanding part of Queensland society. The friendly societies came to Australia as part of the British philosophy of self-help and mutual aid which became prevalent during the industrial revolution. The building is also of interest for its legacy as part of the 1880s development boom which transformed Paddington from a semi-rural area into a commuter suburb of Brisbane. The Paddington Foresters' Hall had a seating capacity of 320 people and provided a thriving community service to the growing population of Paddington as a hall which could be let to the public for meetings including local Rechabites, the Salvation Army, the Ithaca Ratepayers Association, the Women's Christian Charity and the Theodore Unmack Society of Masons, the local Labour Party. In 1996, the hall was purchased by the present owners and Vinnies, an opportunity shop run by the Order of St Vincent de Paul, is there now.
 The former Salvation Army Hall at 29 Latrobe Terrace (now Endeavour Opportunity Shop). The hall was built in 1897 and the "Army" played a vital role in providing relief during the various depressions. Its presence in the area reflects the former working class area of the suburb. The building was sold to private owners in the 1970s.
 The former Paddington Plaza Theatre on 153 – 171 Latrobe Terrace (now the Paddington Antique Centre) is a traditional example of the 1930s movie house. It is a large and imposing timber building with rendered brickwork at either end and an awning which protrudes from the facade. The roof is gabled and constructed of corrugated iron. The building has been little modified internally and the main area is a large rectangular space with a vaulted plaster ceiling. The building is important in illustrating the pattern of development of suburban cinemas in Brisbane, and in illustrating the evolution of cinemas in Queensland, during the interwar years of the 20th century. It is important also in illustrating the pattern of development of the Paddington district. The building was erected circa 1929 by Brisbane contractor John Hutchinson [later J Hutchinson & Sons] for Greater Brisbane Motion Pictures Ltd and probably designed by Brisbane architect Richard Gailey jnr, the Plaza is a rare early 20th century 'atmospheric' theatre in Queensland. This ceiling was painted a vibrant blue and stars used to twinkle and backlit clouds and a moon moved across the sky on tracks. The blue paint is still apparent and some of the clouds still exist as does the proscenium which is constructed of plaster and features ornate plaster work. The term "atmospheric" denotes a picture theatre with an interior décor that simulated an exotic outdoor setting. Atmospheric cinemas were popularised in Australia in the late 1920s and early 1930s after the architect for Sydney-based Union Theatres, Henry White, travelled to the United States to study picture theatre design. Shortly after construction commenced, the Hutchinson family acquired both the building and the land, commencing a long association with the theatre. In 1929 the Plaza Theatre faced strong competition from at least two rival picture shows in the Paddington-Red Hill district: Stephens New Paddington Theatre on Given Terrace [c1924] (which was demolished in the early 1980s to make the Paddington Centre) and Red Hill Picture Pops on Enoggera Terrace [c1920] (which became the Red Hill Roller Skating rink and "mysteriously" burnt down following a development proposal in the early 2000s). Although the Plaza was by no means the first picture theatre in the Paddington district, it was the most ornate, erected in a third wave of picture theatre construction which swept Brisbane suburbs in the late 1920s and 1930s. The picture theatre was open seven days a week, with serials shown on Monday and Tuesday nights, films and newsreels on other nights, and a matinee programme on Sunday afternoons. On Saturdays, trams reputedly would stop outside the theatre at opening time and wait until the film finished to take patrons home again. Popular films attracted audiences of around 1200, for the movies appealed to all ages. A special soundproofed glass room, called the 'cry room', was provided for young mothers and their babies. The Plaza theatre also hosted dances and balls mainly for the local school of Marist Brothers Rosalie. The theatre operated successfully until television was introduced to Brisbane in the late 1950s, by which time Plaza audiences were reduced to 20-30 patrons per screening ( though the auditorium in 1960 contained seating for 932 persons). In 1961 the Plaza Theatre ceased to operate as a cinema and a level floor was installed and the building was used for indoor basketball until a court case instigated by a neighbour who complained of the noise. The plaza remained mostly vacant until 1974 and was sold in 1977. It now houses an antiques retailing centre. The shops fronting Latrobe Terrace are still occupied by a variety of tenants, and the complex is still the focus of a small nodal shopping centre. The Plaza Theatre (Paddington Antique Centre) complex now includes a series of small retail shops on either side of the foyer entrance.
 The Ithaca Embankments on Latrobe Terrace below the Ithaca War memorial on first blush appear to be nothing more than a cut away into the side of a hill. They however are important in demonstrating the principal characteristics of the Ithaca Town Council's early 20th century street beautification projects, being some of the best surviving examples, and provide important surviving evidence of stone retaining wall and edging techniques practised by Brisbane's public landscape gardeners in the early 20th century, which were influential on civic landscaping throughout Queensland and Australia.

Enoggera Terrace

Ithaca Presbyterian Church, 100 Enoggera Terrace, Paddington, built in 1928 and of the Interwar Gothic style with the use of simple Gothic details such as the pointed entrance arch and simple tracery to the windows and entrance. The building is heritage listed.
 The distinctive Paddington Substation at 150 Enoggera Terrace erected in 1929-30 during a period of tramways expansion which followed the Brisbane City Council's 1925 acquisition of the tramways system from the Brisbane Tramways Trust. It was erected on Cook's Hill, along the Paddington line, on land which was formerly part of the adjacent Ithaca Fire Station. The function of the Paddington substation, was to assist the Petrie Terrace substation (erected 1927–28) in providing a better distribution of power to the increased western suburbs tram services from the powerhouse at New Farm. The Paddington substation, constructed of bricks and structural steel from the old Countess Street power house which closed in mid-1928, was the first of his substation designs to incorporate a parapet wall, flat roof and exterior render. The substation commenced operation on 11 August 1930 and remained in service until the phasing out of Brisbane's trams in the late 1960s. In 1969 the Paddington line was closed, the substation's electrical equipment was removed, and the building became a storage depot and subsequently an art space and art centre.
 The former Ithaca Fire Station, at 140 Enoggera Terrace, constructed in two stages, 1918–19 and 1928, is an excellent example of "between the wars" Queensland civic architecture. The place is an integral member of an historic group on Cook's Hill which includes the adjacent Ithaca War Memorial and Park, The Paddington Substation, and Ithaca Embankments. The brigade was formed in 1918 by the merger of the Ithaca and Milton Volunteer Fire Brigades, and provided the inner western suburbs with a permanent fire fighting force of four, with six auxiliary staff. It was closed down in the early 1980s.
 The Ithaca War Memorial located on a parcel of land sandwiched between Enoggera and Latrobe Terraces on Cooks Hill and erected circa 1922. The memorial at Ithaca demonstrates the principal characteristics of a commemorative structure erected as an enduring record of a major historical event but also is rare as an early example of the clock tower type of memorial in the Brisbane area. The memorial provides evidence of an era of widespread Australian patriotism and nationalism, particularly during and following the First World War and memorial services are still held there every year on Anzac day. The stone memorial honours the 130 local men who died on active service during the First World War. The small park surrounding the memorial also has special associations with landscape gardener Alexander Jolly as one of the few remaining examples of his work, and with monumental masonry firm AH Thurlow. Much of the impetus for the work came from Ithaca Town Council's landscape gardener, Alexander Jolly, (father of the first Mayor of Greater Brisbane, William Jolly), who was a horticultural enthusiast and whose lifetime of gardening experience transformed the Ithaca townscape in the period c1915-25. Some of Jolly's more prominent projects included the rockeries along Musgrave and Waterworks Roads; the landscaping of Cook's Hill; and the Ithaca War Memorial garden, which, after his death, was named Alexander Jolly Park, in memory of one of the most esteemed men in the district, and as a unique tribute to the pick and shovel. Only small sections of the Waterworks Road rockeries remain, and most of the Cook's Hill garden was destroyed when the Paddington Tramways Substation was erected in 1929–30.

Others

Government House at 168 Fernberg Road in upper Paddington and is the official residence of the governor of Queensland and has been since 1911. The main house, built in 1865 and originally known as Fernberg there were extensive additions in the 1880s. The building is the only remaining substantial residence and villa estate, of almost original proportions, in Brisbane from the 1860s and with the later additions is regarded among the finest examples of a Victorian Italianate villa in Brisbane. The building was originally built by businessman Johann Christian Heussler who is believed to have given his home "Fernberg" a name of German origin that meant "distant mountain". The property was sold to businessmen George and Nathan Cohen in 1878 and then to various other businessmen before finally being bought by the State Government in 1911.
 The Marist Brothers Monastery, Fernberg Road, Rosalie. The building is heritage listed.
 Paddington Water Tower at 16 Garfield Drive (on what is known as Archibald's Hill) is an elevated reinforced concrete water tank on Paddington's highest point which can be seen from miles around. It is probably the only one of its type in Queensland being a reinforced concrete tank elevated on concrete columns. The tank's height from the highest point is 70 feet (21.34 metres) and the tank has a capacity of 100,000 gallons (.38 megalitre) though it is not in use at present. It is important in demonstrating a phase in the history of Brisbane's water supply and the technological difficulties of providing reticulated water to elevated sites. It was constructed for a cost of £12,000 and completed in 1927.
 The La Boite building which formerly housed the "La Boite Theatre Group" at Hale Street, Milton. The building was Australia's first purpose-built, 200 seat theatre in the round (designed by architect Blair Wilson). The award-winning "modernist" building became an iconic and much loved Brisbane theatrical landmark. The La Boite officially opened on Sunday 4 June 1972 and hosted many plays, both mainstream and controversial before relocating in 2003 to the more sterile State sponsored Kelvin Grove Village. The building is occupied by Evans Harch builders.

Notable residents

 Ned Hanlon (1887–1952) – railway worker, grocer and Premier of Queensland 1946–1952 was born in Paddington.
 Hector Hogan (1931–1960), sprinter and Olympic medallist was educated at Marist Brothers Rosalie
 Terry Lewis – former disgraced Queensland Commissioner of Police lived in Paddington prior to his incarceration on corruption charges
 Barry Maranta (educator, businessman, sports management, co-founder of the Australian-based Brisbane Broncos rugby league team) was educated at Marist Brothers Rosalie
 Warren Moon (Australian Footballer, soccer player, plays in the Scottish Football first division) was educated at Marist Brothers Rosalie
 Sir Arthur Morgan (1856–1916), newspaper proprietor and "progressive" Premier of Queensland 1903–1906 lived in Paddington at the time of his death.
 Sir Kenneth Morris (1903–1978), army officer, shoe/boot manufacturer, liberal/conservative politician, deputy premier of Queensland 1957–1962 was born in Paddington.
 Gordon Olive (1916-1987)- Australian fighter ace in the Battle of Britain, World War II
 Stan Pilecki (1947)(Australian Team Rugby Union Captain 1970s–1980s) was educated at Marist Brothers Rosalie
 Santo Santoro (1956)(former Liberal Party Senator) was educated at Marist Brothers Rosalie
 Bull Tillney, WW2 veteran and POW lived next door (oral history J. Campbell)

 The band The End lived in Paddington and played at the Caxton Street Hall in 1981, before transforming into the band Died Pretty.
 Paul Piticco, music and hospitality entrepreneur, grew up in the suburb and attended Petrie Terrace State School.
 Errol O'Neill (1945 - 2016) playwright, actor, writer, director, dramaturg and producer, specialising in the creation of new work for the theatre lived in Glanmire Street, Paddington for many years

Cultural references
 Caxton Street is mentioned in the song "Brisbane (Security City)" by The Saints, from their 1978 album Prehistoric Sounds.
 "THE PADDO BOYS - A baby boomer's journey through the Seventies" (Zeus Publications, 2017) by Peter Coman is a memoir, in part, about growing up in the Paddington working class milieu of the 1960s and 1970s. Peter Coman was raised in Paddington and went to school at Marist Brothers Rosalie.
 Nick Earls’ 1996 novel "Zigzag Street" takes place around Brisbane's inner west - Red Hill, Paddington and Milton. Local references are frequent and specific.

References

Further reading
 Heritage Trail: Latrobe and Given Terraces, Paddington, Series No 10, 2nd Edition, Brisbane City Council, 1995.
 Padd, Paddo, Paddington, Dawn Buckberry (ed), Paddington History Group, 1999
 The History of the Sacred Heart Parish Rosalie 1898–1998, Ellen Ries, Private Publication, 1998
 Radical Brisbane: An Unruly History, Raymond Evans & Carole Ferrier (eds), The Vulgar Press, 2004

External links

 
 
 

 
Suburbs of the City of Brisbane